Grace Miriam Kerns (August 27, 1879 – September 10, 1936) was an American soprano, called the "Nightingale of the Trenches" for her popularity during World War I. She made over a hundred recordings during the 1910s.

Early life 
Kerns was born in Norfolk, Virginia, and lived in Williamsport, Pennsylvania, a daughter in the large family of Andrew Jackson Kerns and Catharine Marinda Clark Kerns. Her father was a saw manufacturer. She studied voice with Emma Cecilia Thursby. She studied in Europe in the summer of 1913.

Career 
Kerns began her professional singing career as a church and oratorio soloist in New York City. She made over a hundred recordings during the 1910s, for Victor, Columbia, Okeh, Empire, and Edison labels. She recorded duets with other singers including Margaret Keyes, Reed Miller, John Barnes Wells, Nevada Van der Veer, and Henry Burr. She sometimes sang under other names, including Miriam Clark and Grace Nash. 

During World War I, she went to France to entertain the troops, earning the nickname "Nightingale of the Trenches." After the war, she returned to church soloist work, and giving concerts. She also sang in radio broadcasts. In her later years she taught voice at Randolph-Macon Women's College in Virginia.

Personal life 
Kerns, her brother, and her nephew all died in a car accident near Williamsburg, Virginia in 1936.

References

External links 

 Grace Kerns and Mildred Potter singing "Whispering Hope" (1916), from YouTube
 Grace Kerns singing "I Dreamt I Dwelt in Marble Halls" (1912), from YouTube
 Grace Kerns singing "Kiss Me Again", from Internet Archive

19th-century births
1936 deaths
American sopranos
People from Norfolk, Virginia
Randolph College faculty